Froot Loops is a sweetened, fruit-flavored breakfast cereal produced by Kellogg's and sold in many countries. The cereal pieces are ring-shaped (hence "loops") and come in a variety of bright colors and they share a  fruit flavor (hence "froot"). The different colors of the loops do not change the taste.

History 

Kellogg's introduced Froot Loops in 1963. Originally, there were only red, orange and yellow loops; green, blue and purple loops were added during the 1990s, with blue being introduced last in 1996. Different production methods are used in the UK, where the company misleadingly sold the idea that each individual loop color was a different flavor. Kellogg's has acknowledged that all share the same fruit-blend flavor.

Mascot 
Toucan Sam has been the mascot of Froot Loops since its first appearance. Toucan Sam is a blue anthropomorphic toucan; the colors of his bill correspond to the three original Froot Loop colors. While toucans have a sense of smell, as most other birds, he is portrayed as having an uncanny ability to smell Froot Loops from great distances and locates a concealed bowl of the cereal while intoning "Follow my nose! It always knows!" or "Follow my nose! For the fruity taste that shows!"

Toucan Sam was first voiced by voice actor Mel Blanc, originally with an "American accent" and later changing to a "British accent".

Varieties
Kellogg's made several varieties of snack foods, including snack bags called Snack Ums. Snack Ums were similar to the cereal but larger. Their slogan was "Super-sized bites with deliciously intense natural fruit flavors" and "Flavor Bursting!" Froot Loops-branding by Kellogg's was also used with the Froot Loops cereal bar, and in 2021 Froot Loops Pop-Tarts.

In the middle of 2012, Kellogg's introduced Froot Loops to the UK market for a limited time with only the secondary colors (orange, green, and purple), as natural color substitutes for red, yellow, and blue could not be found. The recipe also differed from the US version. Kellogg's stated that "due to European legislation we have been unable to produce Froot Loops to the same specifications as the US product. The formulations are different, including sugar and salt levels and the UK version has been produced with natural food additives and flavorings which will account for the differences in appearance and taste between the two products." The UK Froot Loops are also larger in size compared with their American counterparts, and due to the different method of formulation, are a much coarser cereal. In September 2015, Kellogg's removed Froot Loops from the UK market due to a lack of demand for the cereal, although in 2017, a special Unicorn Froot Loops limited edition was released in the UK. As of 2019, special limited edition Unicorn Froot Loops, Mermaid Froot Loops, and Baby Shark Froot Loops cereals have been made available.

Froot Loops Black Beak Saga 
From around 2005 to 2007, a promotion featured Toucan Sam and his three nephews discovering a map leading to the treasure of Black Beak the pirate. Each commercial continued the storyline, either showing the crew sailing to a new island, fighting some creature that was after their Froot Loops, or learning more about Black Beak himself. Some of these commercials led to new flavors of Froot Loops being introduced as the story progressed, including \ Froot Loops Golden Berry, Colossal Froot Loops, Froot Loops Starberries, Froot Loops Smoothie, Froot Loops Darkberries, Froot Loops Double Lemony Loot, and Froot Loops Fruity Golden Bars. The promotion ended with Sam and his nephews finding Black Beak's treasure and Black Beak himself, whom they defeated and subsequently shared a bowl of Froot Loops with.

References

External links 

 
 Kellogg's corporate Froot Loops site: includes package information and nutrition facts.

Kellogg's cereals
Products introduced in 1963